The United States junior handball team is the national under–21 handball team of the United States. Controlled by USA Team Handball it represents USA in international matches.

Tournament summary

World Championship

IHF Inter-Continental Trophy

References

External links

References 

Men's national junior handball teams